高平 may refer to:

People
Takahira, a Japanese surname
Kōhei (given name), a Japanese masculine given name
Gao Ping (born 1970), Chinese composer

Places
Gaoping, a city in Shanxi, China
Cao Bằng Province, a province in northern Vietnam
Cao Bằng, the capital of Cao Bằng Province